Adventures with Purpose is a group of scuba divers who use sonar to locate missing persons and their vehicles in waterbodies. Originally focused on clean-up, they turned their focus to missing persons cold cases. The group documents their efforts on their YouTube channel.

Background
Adventures with Purpose (AWP) was founded by Oregon-based Sam Ginn and Jared Leisek in 2019. They began as an environmental cleanup agency, removing cars that were polluting waterways. Doug Bishop, a diver and manager of a towing company, also joined the group. After twice finding cars with missing people in them, they determined a need to look for people who have gone missing in or with their vehicles. The channel receives tip-offs and requests from the public through their social media accounts. They do not pursue rewards from family or charge the families or police involved, but will not reject rewards if given. Instead, AWP funds its searches through video views, subscribers, donations, and merchandise sales. In 2020, AWP threatened to sue for a $100,000 reward pledged by five anonymous donors for the discovery of Ethan Kazmerzak, who had disappeared in 2013. The Kazmerzak family donated an undisclosed amount.

In October 2022, the team had six members. The following month, Leisek was accused of raping a 9-year-old child at age 16-17 in Utah in 1992. Several team members, including Bishop, diver Nick Rinn, and lead videographer Josh Cantu subsequently left the team. On January 5, 2023, Leisek was booked in Sanpete, UT.

On January 7, 2023, Adventures with Purpose announced they are on a 3-month tour with a new team of divers and filmmakers.

Search process
At the identified waterbody, the team traverse the waters in small inflatable boats, scanning the bottom of the waterbody using sonar. Upon identifying areas of interest, they circle the area for further identification on their sonar displays before using a heavy-duty magnet to attach their line to the sunken vehicle. They mark the location with a buoy and then use divers to make a visual identification of the vehicle, retrieve a license plate, search for bodies, and prepare the vehicle and its contents for retrieval by police.

Cases
The team usually deals with cold cases, however they have also volunteered for searches in recent cases; an example would be searching on August 22, 2022, for Kiely Rodni, who went missing on August 6, 2022. Certain recent cases may be incidental while searching the waterbody for a cold case. As of October 26, 2022, the group has solved 25 missing person cases. AWP also sometimes cooperates with other teams with the same purpose, such as Exploring with Nug and Chaos Divers.

Footnotes

References 

YouTube channels launched in 2019
English-language YouTube channels
Missing people organizations